Rahmatabad (also Romanized as Raḩmatābād) is a village in Jowzdan Rural District, in the Central District of Najafabad County, Isfahan Province, Iran. At the 2006 census, its population was 1,692, in 420 families.

References 

Populated places in Najafabad County